Chris Cross (born 1952) is an English musician, best known as the bass guitarist in the new wave band Ultravox.

Chris Cross may also refer to:
Chris Cross (magician) (born 1989), comedy contortionist, magician and escapologist
ChrisCross, American comic book artist
Christopher Cross (born 1951), American singer and songwriter
Christopher Cross (album), his debut album
Kris Kross, rap duo
Kris Kross Amsterdam, a Dutch trio of DJs and record producers
Christopher Cross, character from the film Scarlet Street
Chris Cross (TV series), a 1993 UK television comedy series
"Chris Cross" (Family Guy), an episode of Family Guy

See also
Chris Griffin (Christopher Cross Griffin), a character from Family Guy
Criss-cross (disambiguation)

Cross, Chris